Sanyuan Station is a metro station at Chengdu, Sichuan, China. It was opened on December 18, 2020 with the opening of Chengdu Metro Line 8 and Line 9.

References

Chengdu Metro stations
Railway stations in China opened in 2020